Vasilyevskoye is a rural locality (a settlement) and the administrative center of Markovskoye Rural Settlement, Vologodsky District, Vologda Oblast, Russia. The population was 1,634 as of 2002. There are 26 streets.

Geography 
Vasilyevskoye is located 23 km southeast of Vologda (the district's administrative centre) by road. Lukintsevo is the nearest rural locality.

References 

Rural localities in Vologodsky District